Joseph P. Kamp (1900–1993) was an American political activist from New York who ran the Constitutional Educational League and was jailed in 1950, for contempt of Congress.

Background

Joseph Peter Kamp was born on May 3, 1900, in Yonkers, New York.  His parents were German-born Joseph Kamp, tailor, and Margaret Franz Kamp.  He attended grammar school in Yonkers and spent a few months at Fordham Prep.

Career

Kamp started his career by working in a law office, followed by work at a newspaper.  In 1921, he worked in construction, at which time he first encountered and joined the Constitutional Educational League.  By 1925, he had become a public speaker for the League.

In 1934, Kamp became executive editor for The Awakener, founded in 1934 by Harold Lord Varney (manager of the Italian Historical Society, which shared offices with the Constitutional Educational League), with fellow editors Lawrence Dennis and Milford W. Howard.  The Awakener folded in 1936.  Kamp sent a manuscript to the League, which published in asa Join the C.I.O. and Help Build a Soviet America.  In 1947, he joined the League's staff as executive vice chairman.

In 1942 and 1943, two federal grand juries issues indictments against people and organizations conspiring against US involvement in World War II; the League appeared both times.  During the 1944 presidential campaign, the Constitutional Educational League published a brochure, Vote CIO and Get A Soviet America. A federal grand jury, investigating 1944 campaign expenditures, sought to find out who the League's financial backers, as requested by a congressional subpoena; Kamp refused to answer. In December 1944, Kamp found himself indicted for Contempt of Congress.

Starting June 16, 1950, Kamp was jailed for four months for refusing back in 1944 to answer questions regarding campaign activities, asked by the House Campaign Expenditures Committee.  (He was also "in trouble" with the House Lobby Investigating committee for refusing to share his organization's records.)  The United States Supreme Court refused to hear his appeal earlier in 1950.

Kamp was tried another time for congressional defiance in 1952, when he failed to produce records for the House Lobby Investigating Committee. This time, Kamp was acquitted of the charge, as the House Committee failed to orderly disclose why Kamp was in default.

Others who also defied Congress over similar issues include:  Edward A. Rumely of the Committee for Constitutional Government and Merwin K. Hart of the National Economic Council, Inc.

Kamp was acquitted of a second contempt charge in relationship with the lobbying activities of the Constitutional Educational League, an anti-communist organization.

Kamp also served as a policy advisor to the Liberty Lobby.

Personal life

Kamp was a great-uncle of actor Jon Voight through his mother, making him the great great uncle of actress Angelina Jolie.

Kamp was associated with Alfred Kohlberg, Merwin K. Hart, Edward A. Rumely, J.B. Matthews, and William F. Buckley Jr.  He also associated with Elizabeth Dilling, author of The Red Network—A Who's Who and Handbook of Radicalism for Patriots (1934).

Gerald L. K. Smith (1898–1976) far-right clergyman and leader of the Christian Nationalist Crusade called Kamp a "well-informed and fearless patriot."

Works
Pamphlets
Kamp seems to have penned all pamphlets published by the Constitutional Educational League:
 Hell of Herrin Rages Again (1937)
 Join the C.I.O. and Help Build a Soviet America (1937)
 Stop Lewis and Smash Communism! Program of the Constitutional Educational League (1939)
 Fifth Column in Washington! (1940)
 Fifth Column in the South (1940)
 Fifth Column vs. the Dies Committee (1941)
 The Fifth Column Stops Defense (1941)
 How to Win the War and Lose What We're Fighting For! (1942)
 Native Nazi Purge Plot (1942)
 Famine in America (1943)
 The Class War on the Home Front (1943)
 With Lotions of Love... (1944)
 Vote CIO and Get a Soviet America (1944)
 Hell with G. I. Joe! (1944)
 Audacious Aubrey Williams and the Sly Strategy of Senator Smear (1945)
 Anything But the Truth: The Story of the Man who Lied to Congress (1945)
 How to be an American, to Organize for America, to Fight Un-Americanism (1946)
 Communist Carpetbaggers in Operation Dixie (1946)
 The Fay Case (1946)
 Strikes and the Communists Behind Them (1947)
 Open Letter to Congress.  Gentlemen:  Are You Mice or Men?  An Underworld Secret-Police Terror Menaces America (1948)
 Behind the Lace Curtains of the YWCA (1948)
 Hitler Was a Liberal (1949)
 America Betrayed:  The Tragic Consequences of Reds on the Government Payroll! (1950)
 It Isn't Safe to be an American (1950)
 We Must Abolish the United States:  The Hidden Facts Behind the Crusade for World Government (1950)
 Was Jesus Christ a Jew? (undated)
Maps
 Join the C.I.O. and help build a Soviet America: a factual narrative (1937)
 The Fifth Column Menaces America on a Thousand Fronts (1941)
Pamphlets by other authors
 Joe Kamp: Hero of the Pro-Fascists (Friends of Democracy)

See also

 Alfred Kohlberg of the John Birch Society
 Edward A. Rumely of the Committee for Constitutional Government 
 Merwin K. Hart of the National Economic Council, Inc.
 The Awakener''

References

External links
FBI files
Joseph Kamp's FBI files obtained through the FOIA and hosted at the Internet Archive

FBI headquarters files part 1
FBI headquarters files part 2
FBI headquarters files part 3
FBI headquarters files part 4
FBI headquarters files part 5
FBI headquarters files part 6
FBI headquarters files part 7
FBI headquarters files part 8
FBI headquarters files part 9
FBI headquarters files part 10
FBI headquarters files part 11
FBI headquarters files part 12
FBI headquarters files part 13
FBI headquarters files part 14
FBI headquarters files part 15
FBI headquarters files part 16
FBI headquarters files part 17
FBI headquarters files part 18

Other documents
 La Museum of the Holocaust:  RG-75.01.28, The Fifth Column in Washington. By Joseph P. Kamp. June 1940

American activists
1900 births
1993 deaths
Old Right (United States)